In mathematics, the Kronheimer–Mrowka basic classes are elements of the second cohomology H2(X) of a simple smooth 4-manifold X that determine its Donaldson polynomials.

References

Differential geometry